Isofraxidin is a chemical compound found in a variety of plants including Eleutherococcus senticosus.

See also
 Isofraxidin-7-glucoside

References 

Coumarins